Uzun Tappeh-ye Olya (also Romanized as Uzūn Tappeh-ye ‘Olyā; also known as Uzūn Tappeh) is a village in Qeshlaq-e Shomali Rural District, in the Central District of Parsabad County, Ardabil Province, Iran. At the 2006 census, its population was 241, in 49 families.

References 

Towns and villages in Parsabad County